The 1931 Sam Houston State Bearkats football team represented Sam Houston State Teachers College (now known as Sam Houston State University) as a member of the Eastern Division of the Texas Intercollegiate Athletic Association (TIAA)during the 1931 college football season. Led by ninth-year head coach J. W. Jones, the Bearkats compiled an overall record of 3–6 with a mark of 2–3 in conference play, placing third in the TIAA's Eastern Division.

Schedule

References

Sam Houston State
Sam Houston Bearkats football seasons
Sam Houston State Bearkats football